Like Two Crocodiles (original Italian title:  Come due coccodrilli) is a 1994 Italian-French drama film directed and co-written by Giacomo Campiotti.

Plot
A successful art dealer, the bastard son of an Italian aristocrat, returns to his family home to avenge himself against his evil stepbrothers.

Cast
 Fabrizio Bentivoglio as Gabriele
 Giancarlo Giannini as  Pietro
 Valeria Golino as  Marta
 Sandrine Dumas as  Claire
 Ignazio Oliva as  Gabriele giovane
 Angela Baraldi as  Antonella

Awards and nominations
David di Donatello Awards (Italy)
Won: Best Supporting Actor (Giancarlo Giannini)
Golden Globe Awards (USA)
Nominated: Best Foreign Language Film
Locarno Film Festival (Switzerland)
Nominated: Golden Leopard (Giacomo Campiotti)

External links 
 

1994 films
Italian drama films
1990s Italian-language films
Films directed by Giacomo Campiotti
1990s Italian films
Fandango (Italian company) films
Italian-language French films
1990s French films
French drama films